Institute of Mathematical Sciences may refer to:

 Institute of Mathematical Sciences, Chennai, a research institute in Chennai, India
 Institute of Mathematical Sciences (Spain)